Richard Leonard Tafel (born 1962) is an American strategist, Christian pastor, and the leader of the Church of the Holy City in Washington, D.C.. He worked as an assistant minister at Memorial Church of Harvard University, and has held a position as a representative on the National Council of Churches' executive committee. He is a founder of Log Cabin Republicans, an organization within the Republican Party which advocates for equal rights for LGBT+ Americans.

Career
Tafel was born in 1962 and raised in Pennsylvania. He received a bachelor's degree in philosophy from East Stroudsburg University of Pennsylvania in 1984 and a master's degree in divinity from Harvard Divinity School in 1987. In 1988, Tafel became one of the first openly gay ministers in the United States in his role as the Assistant Minister at Harvard's chapel under the mentorship of the Rev. Peter J. Gomes.

In 1991 he became one of the first openly gay political appointees in the US as Adolescent Health Director for the state of Massachusetts. In that role, he helped advise Governor Bill Weld to create the first gay and lesbian youth commission in the US, and the first civil unions for government employees.

In 1992, Tafel engaged in a debate with the Rev. Jerry Falwell on Larry King Live that led him to create a full-time advocacy organization.

In 1993 he opened the office in Washington, DC, as the first full-time lobbying office for gay rights in the United States, called Log Cabin Republicans. During this time, he became the first Republican activist to champion gay marriage, conducting a series of college debates in 1995 with the Christian Action Network. Newsweek magazine identified them as one of the 30 most influential gay leaders in the United States.

In 1999 he wrote Party Crasher: A Gay Republican Challenges Politics as Usual. The United States Junior Chamber listed him among the Ten Outstanding Young Americans of 2001.

In 2002 he stepped down from this role, starting his own strategy company working with over one hundred social ventures. His project includes strategic advice for creating the President's Emergency Plan for AIDS Relief (PEPFAR) to deliver HIV/AIDS drugs to Africa. He helped coordinate a Congressional staff delegation to explore options for US engagement in addressing the crisis. He lobbied on Capitol Hill for the creation of what would be called the PEPFAR program. It provided $5.4 billion to make anti-retroviral medication widely available, saving millions of lives.

In Latin America, the United States Agency for International Development (USAID) engaged Tafel to help create the first strategy for Mexico to address AIDS discrimination in the workplace. As AIDS discrimination declined and other health issues rose, Tafel was one of the three founders of The Workplace Wellness Council of Mexico, which comprises over one hundred Fortune 100 companies seeking to increase employee health.

References 

Living people
American Pentecostal pastors
American LGBT rights activists
East Stroudsburg University of Pennsylvania alumni
Harvard Divinity School alumni
Year of birth missing (living people)